Dean Milton Gillespie (May 3, 1884 – February 2, 1949) was a U.S. Representative from Colorado.

Early life and education
Born in Salina, Kansas, the youngest son of Dr. D. M. Gillespie and Mrs. D. M. Gillespie of Blaine Township, Clay County, Kansas. His father has been a pioneer of Kansas and was a physician. He also published a temperance newspaper entitled, The Rising Sun.

Gillespie attended the public schools and Salina Normal University. He engaged in agricultural pursuits and cattle raising in Clay County, Kansas, from 1900 to 1904.

Career
He moved to Denver, Colorado, in 1905 and worked as grocery clerk, sign painter, and salesman. He engaged in the automobile and oil business since 1905. Gillespie founded Power Equipment Company and incorporated under the corporate laws of Colorado on September 14, 1936. Operations were initially conducted through two affiliated corporations, Power Equipment Co. and Dean Gillespie & Co., which firms controlled the franchises for Allis-Chalmers Construction Equipment and White Motor trucks.

Gillespie was elected as a Republican to the 78th Congress to fill the vacancy caused by the death of Lawrence Lewis, reelected to the 79th Congress, and served from March 7, 1944, to January 3, 1947.
He was an unsuccessful candidate for reelection in 1946 to the 80th Congress.

He then returned to his former business pursuits. He was president of Dean Gillespie & Company, president of Motoroyal Oil Company, and vice president of BluHill Food Corporation. He was an Elk, Mason, Shriner and a member of a number organizations.

Personal life
He married Lillie Baldwin on January 29, 1908, in Golden, Colorado. They had two daughters. One of his daughters, Ruth Gillespie, was an attorney in Denver. Lillie died in 1941.

He had the world's largest collection of meteorites and often gave talks about meteorites.

He checked himself into Johns Hopkins Hospital while on a business trip and died of a heart attack on February 2, 1949, in Baltimore, Maryland. He was interred in Fairmount Cemetery, Denver, Colorado.

References

External links 
 

1884 births
1949 deaths
Republican Party members of the United States House of Representatives from Colorado
20th-century American politicians